Streets of New York (2006) is the fifth studio album by New York City based singer/songwriter Willie Nile. This is Nile's tribute to the city that gave him international exposure to the music world through the critical eyes and ears of the New York Times.

Background
The album is a tour book of City images; The tourists, the subway, the West Side, Rivington Street, a circus at Washington Square where one meets Bo Diddley, a Broadway night out with Annie, where we encounter a saddened aging actress whose best years are far behind her. A protest and a chilling reminder of the modern dangers we all face in today's world. The album is a portrait of the maze of iron, stone, and people that makes New York so unique, while mocking its opulence; still Nile always finds his way back home to the "Streets of New York".

Critical Reception

 Luke Torn of Uncut magazine wrote: "Streets of New York is the New-Normal, post-9/11 album no-one else dared write - epic and prophetic."

 Chosen "Classic American Album" by David Jarman of Americana-UK.  Jarman writes; "One of those albums which keeps calling you back – a true classic".

Track listing
 "Welcome to My Head" – 3:22 (W. Nile)
 "Asking Annie Out" – 3:11 (W. Nile, F. Lee)
 "Game of Fools" – 4:10 (W. Nile, F. Lee)
 "Back Home" – 6:24 (W. Nile)
 "The Day I Saw Bo Diddley In Washington Square" – 4:46 (W. Nile, F. Lee)
 "Best Friends Money Can Buy" – 3:17 (W. Nile)
 "Faded Flower of Broadway" – 5:12  (W. Nile, F. Lee)
 "When One Stands" – 4:46 (W. Nile, F. Lee)
 "Whole World With You" – 4:10 (W. Nile)
 "On Some Rainy Day" – 5:10 (W. Nile, F. Lee)
 "Cell Phones Ringing (In The Pockets Of The Dead" – 5:13 (W. Nile)
 "Lonesome Dark-Eyed Beauty" – 5:47 (W. Nile)
 "Police On My Back" – 3:33 (E. Grant)
 "Streets Of New York" – 5:20 (W. Nile)

Personnel
 Willie Nile – guitar, vocals, piano, organ, rhodes
 Andy York – Guitar, Piano, Organ, Mellotron, Tambourine, Backing vocals
Brad Albetta – Electric & Acoustic Bass
Rich Pagano – Drums, Percussion, Backing vocals
Frankie Lee – Drums, Percussion, Congas, Backing vocals

Guest musicians

Bruce Brody – Hammond B3
Andy Burton – String box, Organ, Piano
Larry Campbell – Mandolin, Fiddle, Citttern
Jakob Dylan – Backing vocals
Rob Hyman – Hammond B3, Toy piano, Keyboards
Rami Jaffee – Hammond B3
Stewart Lerman – Electric Guitar
Brian Mitchell - Wurlitzer
Eddy Nystrom – Acoustic Guitar
Fred Parcels – Tin Whistle, Trombone
Jeff Tuel - Backing Vocals

Production
Executive Producer: George Hecksher
Producers: Willie Nile, Rich Pagano, Andy York, Brad Albetta, Frankie  Lee
Engineering: Brian Fulk, Brad Albetta, Rich Lamb, Rich Pagano, Stewart Lerman, Michael Golub
Remixing: Rich Pagano, Jamey Staub, Stewart Lerman
Mastering:  Fred Kevorkian
Cover photo: Jeff Fasano
Photography: Godis, Jeff Fasano, Luke Noonan, Bourdeau Brothers, Judy Finelly,
Art Direction: Victoria Collier, Deborah Maniaci

References

External links
NPR Review of Streets of New York

2006 albums
Willie Nile albums
Music of New York City